Roman Romanovych Bondaruk (born June 20, 1974 in Lviv) is a Ukrainian sport shooter.

Career
He won two silver medals in rapid fire pistol at the 2006 ISSF World Cup series in Munich, Germany, and in Milan, Italy, accumulating scores of 780.2 and 780.9 points, respectively.

At the age of thirty-four, Bondaruk made his official debut for the 2008 Summer Olympics in Beijing, where he competed in the men's 25 m rapid fire pistol, along with his teammate Oleksandr Petriv. He finished only in sixth place by 1.9 points behind U.S. shooter Keith Sanderson, with a total score of 774.7 targets (580 in the preliminary rounds and 194.7 in the final).

At the 2012 Summer Olympics in London, Bondaruk hit a total of 579 targets (284 on the first stage and 295 on the second) in the preliminary rounds of the men's 25 m rapid fire pistol, finishing in twelfth place, and not qualifying for the final.

References

External links
NBC 2008 Olympics profile

Ukrainian male sport shooters
Living people
Olympic shooters of Ukraine
Shooters at the 2008 Summer Olympics
Shooters at the 2012 Summer Olympics
Shooters at the 2016 Summer Olympics
Sportspeople from Lviv
1974 births
European Games competitors for Ukraine
Shooters at the 2015 European Games
21st-century Ukrainian people